"Stand Up (For the Champions)" is a song by British band Right Said Fred from their album Stand Up in 2002.

In the United States, the song has been used by some National Football League teams.

It was used for the medal ceremony at the LEN European Swimming Championships in Budapest, Hungary in August 2010.

In Pakistan, the song has been used for the celebration of Pakistan Cricket Team. It was played after the victory in the final against India at the 2017 ICC Champions Trophy in England.

The song was also played at Lord's during the 2009 T20 Cricket World Cup when Pakistan's national cricket team beat Sri Lanka in the final and won the World Cup.

Charts

References

2002 singles
Right Said Fred songs